Listed below are the 1998 UCI Women's Teams that competed in 1998 women's road cycling events organized by the International Cycling Union (UCI).

Source:

References

1998
UCI Women
UCI Women